Mount Franklin is a peak standing between Breckinridge Peak and Washington Ridge in the southern group of the Rockefeller Mountains, on Edward VII Peninsula in Marie Byrd Land, Antarctica. It was discovered by the Byrd Antarctic Expedition on January 27, 1929. The name was applied by the United States Antarctic Service (1939–41), which established a seismic station camp on this peak.

References

Mountains of King Edward VII Land